Helesius is a genus of lady beetles in the family Coccinellidae. There are at least two described species in Helesius.

Species
These two species belong to the genus Helesius:
 Helesius nigripennis (LeConte, 1878)
 Helesius nubilans Casey, 1899

References

Further reading

 
 

Coccinellidae
Coccinellidae genera
Articles created by Qbugbot